Alma Vogt (25 February 1925 – 4 May 2006) was an Australian cricket player. Vogt played one  Test match for the Australia national women's cricket team. Vogt died in Queensland on 4 May 2006, at the age of 81.

References

1925 births
2006 deaths
Australia women Test cricketers